Miko Eric Oliver Enkamp (born August 10, 1991) is a Swedish mixed martial artist who competes in the Welterweight division of the Bellator MMA.

Background

Karate 
Enkamp grew up with martial arts as his family runs Combat Academy - a martial arts center in Täby - where he himself started training already at a couple of years old.  Having a permanent training partner in his brother would pay off and he was, among other things, selected to the Swedish junior national team in karate after traveling around Europe and competing in both Kata (his brother Jesse's specialty) and Kumite. During the years he was active in karate, he visited Okinawa in Japan several times to learn more directly from the birthplace of karate.

Kickboxing 
As a teenager, his interests expanded and he started training kickboxing after watching matches in K-1 on Eurosport. At this time, in addition to karate training, the club also had two kickboxing coaches named Anders Carlsson and Roger Wikström who helped him develop and became something of a mentor to Enkamp.

Submission grappling 
At the same time as the sport of MMA gained momentum, Enkamp became interested in grappling and began training at the club Pancrase Gym to add submissions to its technical register. Shortly afterwards, he started competing in this, which led him to a gold in the SGL - Swedish Grappling League.  Oliver attributes his creativity and movement patterns on the ground to all the years he practiced breakdance as a teenager.

Thai boxing 
As soon as Enkamp graduated from high school, he went to Phuket, Thailand and Tiger Muay Thai to practice Thai boxing . He stayed there for nine weeks and managed to attend his first professional Muay Thai match.  A match that spread widely after he won via main kick and KO in the second round.

Mixed martial arts career

Early career

Amateur 
In 2009, Enkamp received an invitation to the summer camp MMA-Academy and he signed up as the only participant from the club. Once in place, a whole new world opened up for him when he realized how deep one could dive into the technical and tactical aspects of the sport. It was the starting shot for what would be his professional MMA career. In 2010 he started competing in shootfighting (today called MMA class-B) and the following year they introduced Amateur MMA (today called MMA class-A) which he competed successfully in and became the first Swedish champion in 2011 after a six-second KO in the final match. The following year, 2012, he defended his title as Swedish champion in welterweight (-77.1 kg) before he with an amateur result of 14-1 decided to start competing professionally.

Professional 
Prior to his professional debut, Enkamp went to the Alliance Training Center in San Diego, CA, USA. There he lived upstairs in the gym for two months and trained with i.a. Ross Pearson, Jeremy Stephens, Brandon Vera, Phil Davis and Dominick Cruz. As prepared as he could be, he went since his debut match on March 9, 2013 at IRFA 4 against the Finn Kari Paivinen and won via reverse triangle throttling in the third round.

Before the next match in IRFA, Enkamp played a match at the Scanian organization Trophy MMA's second gala where he 1 June 2013 won his second professional match via rear-naked in the second round against the Swede Erik Greissen.  After that, he spent a summer with his brother in Hawaii and visited BJ Penn's gym in Hilo.

Then back under IRFA's flag, he met Georg the Swede Guram Kutateladze on April 5, 2014 at IRFA 6 and won by unanimous decision.

When he then returned to the USA, he made it to the American Top Team to wrestle with e.g. Thiago Alves and sparred with Gleison Tibau. Six months later at IRFA 7 on 22 November 2014, Enkamp met the Pole Lukasz Bieniek, whom he defeated via submission late in the second round.

In the spring of 2015, Enkamp flew to Las Vegas to participate in the competitions for the TV series The Ultimate Fighter, where he joined the European team coached by Conor McGregor. The following summer, there was a training trip to Lyoto Machida's dojo in Belém, Brazil, where he made good contact with the former UFC champion and advice on what would lead him to a future contract with the UFC. However, a knee injury from training in Brazil put a stop to the TUF opportunity.

On September 17, 2016 at IRFA 10, it was time for the next match. This time against the Dutchman Arne Boekee in the gala's main match which Enkamp defeated via armbar / triangle in the second round.

Superior Challenge 
Less than a month after his last match in IRFA, Enkamp went up against the Brazilian Rickson Pontes at SC 14. After a tough match, Enkamp won via unanimous decision and was noticed by Swedish newspapers.

About six months later, April 1, 2017 came the next match in SC 15 where he met the Dane Frodi Vitalis Hansen and won via TKO already in the first round.

Ultimate Fighting Championship
Enkamp, as a replacement for Emil Weber Meek, made his UFC debut on short notice on 28 May 2017 at UFC Fight Night: Gustafsson vs. Teixeira. He lost the fight by unanimous decision.

Enkamp faced Danny Roberts on 17 March 2018 at UFC Fight Night: Werdum vs. Volkov. He lost the fight via knockout in the first round.

After his second straight loss, he was released from the UFC.

Bellator MMA 
Enkamp made his Bellator debut against Walter Gahadza on June 22, 2019 at Bellator 223. He won the bout via rear-naked choke at the end of the first round.

Enkamp's next match in Bellator was confirmed on August 8 and it was against the Italian Giorgio Pietrini on October 12, 2019 at Bellator 230 and was the second main match, co-main.  On 17 September, MMAjunkie announced that Giorgio Pietrini had been removed from the card due to illness and that Bellator was looking for a new opponent for Enkamp, and on 26 September, Enkamp himself announced via instagram that the match had been canceled.

In his sophomore performance, Enkamp faced Lewis Long on February 22, 2022 at Bellator 240. He scored a highlight finish, knocking out spinning back fist in the first round.

Enkamp faced Emmanuel Dawa on October 10, 2020 at Bellator 248. He scored a japanese necktie to win the bout in the first round.

Enkamp faced Kyle Crutchmer on December 3, 2021 at Bellator 272. He lost his first Bellator bout via unanimous decision.

Enkamp faced Mark Lemminger on May 13, 2022 at Bellator 281. He won this fight scoring a buggy choke, the first in Bellator history, in the third round.

Enkamp was scheduled to face Luca Poclit on February 25, 2023 at Bellator 291. However, Enkamp had to pull out of the bout due to injury.

Personal life 
Oliver's brother, Jesse Enkamp, runs a successful Youtube channel, with over 500,000 subscribers, where he discusses karate and other topics related to martial arts. Oliver makes frequent appearances on the channel with his brother covering his training camps and other aspects of his MMA career.

Mixed martial arts record

|-
|Win
|align=center|11–3
|Mark Lemminger
|Submission (buggy choke)
|Bellator 281 
|
|align=center|3
|align=center|0:25
|London, England
|
|-
|Loss
|align=center|10–3
|Kyle Crutchmer
|Decision (unanimous)
|Bellator 272
|
|align=center|3
|align=center|5:00
|Uncasville, Connecticut, United States
|
|-
|Win
|align=center|10–2
|Emmanuel Dawa
|Submission (japanese necktie)
|Bellator 248
|
|align=center|1
|align=center|4:10
|Paris, France
|
|-
|Win
|align=center|9–2
|Lewis Long
|KO (spinning back fist)
|Bellator 240
|
|align=center|1
|align=center|4:10
|Dublin, Ireland
|  
|-
|Win
|align=center|8–2
|Walter Gahadza
|Submission (rear-naked choke)
|Bellator 223
|
|align=center|1
|align=center|4:54
|London, England
|
|-
|Loss
|align=center|7–2
|Danny Roberts
|KO (punch)
|UFC Fight Night: Werdum vs. Volkov 
|
|align=center|1
|align=center|2:12
|London, England
|
|-
|Loss
|align=center|7–1
|Nordine Taleb
|Decision (unanimous)
|UFC Fight Night: Gustafsson vs. Teixeira
|
|align=center|3
|align=center|5:00
|Stockholm, Sweden
|
|-
|Win
|align=center|7–0
|Frodi Vitalis Hansen
|TKO (punches)
|Superior Challenge 15
|
|align=center|1
|align=center|4:50
|Stockholm, Sweden
|
|-
|Win
|align=center|6–0
|Rickson Pontes
|Decision (unanimous)
|Superior Challenge 14
|
|align=center|3
|align=center|5:00
|Stockholm, Sweden
|
|-
|Win
|align=center|5–0
|Arne Boekee
|Submission (triangle choke)
|IRFA 10
|
|align=center|2
|align=center|2:25
|Stockholm, Sweden
| 
|-
|Win
|align=center|4–0
|Łukasz Bieniek
|Submission (rear-naked choke)
|IRFA 7
|
|align=center|2
|align=center|4:52
|Solna, Sweden
|
|-
|Win
|align=center|3–0
|Guram Kutateladze
|Decision (unanimous)
|IRFA 6
|
|align=center|3
|align=center|5:00
|Solna, Sweden
|
|-
|Win
|align=center|2–0
|Erik Greisson
|Submission (rear-naked choke)
|Trophy MMA 2
|
|align=center|2
|align=center|3:17
|Malmö, Sweden
|
|-
|Win
|align=center|1–0
|Kari Paivinen
|Submission (inverted triangle choke)
|IRFA 4
|
|align=center|3
|align=center|1:50
|Solna, Sweden
|

See also 
 List of current Bellator fighters
 List of male mixed martial artists

References

External links 
  
  
 

1991 births
People from Täby Municipality
Living people
Swedish male mixed martial artists
Welterweight mixed martial artists
Mixed martial artists utilizing karate
Mixed martial artists utilizing Muay Thai
Bellator male fighters
Swedish male karateka
Swedish Muay Thai practitioners
Ultimate Fighting Championship male fighters